YCM may refer to:

 Y chromosome microdeletion, a family of genetic disorders caused by missing genes in the Y chromosome
 YCM, the IATA code for St. Catharines/Niagara District Airport, Niagara-on-the-Lake, Ontario, Canada